The 2018 Hungarian Canoe Sprint Championships was held in Szolnok, from 29 to 31 August 2018.

Explanation of events
Canoe sprint competitions were contested in either a Canadian canoe (C), an open canoe with a single-blade paddle, or in a kayak (K), a closed canoe with a double-bladed paddle. Each canoe or kayak can hold one person (1), two people (2), or four people (4). For each of the specific canoes or kayaks, such as a K-1 (kayak single), the competition distances can be 200, 500, 1000 or 5000 metres. When a competition is listed as a K-2 500m event, for example, it means two people were in a kayak competing over a distance of 500 metres.

Paracanoe competitions were contested in either a va'a (V), an outrigger canoe (which includes a second pontoon) with a single-blade paddle, or in a kayak (as above). All international competitions were held over 200 metres in single-man boats, with three event classes in both types of vessel for men and women depending on the level of an athlete's impairment. The lower the classification number, the more severe the impairment is - for example, VL1 is a va'a competition for those with particularly severe impairments.

Medal overview

Medal table

Except for paracanoe events.

Men's events

Canoe (men's)

Kayak (men's)

Women's events

Canoe (women's)

Kayak (women's)

Paracanoe

Medal events

See also
2016 Hungarian Canoeing Championships
Hungarian Canoe Sprint Championships
Hungarian Canoe Federation

References

External links
Official website of the Hungarian Fencing Federation

Hungarian Canoeing Championships
Canoe Sprint Championships
Hungarian Canoe Sprint Championships